Catherine was a metalcore band from Sacramento, California.

Discography

Videography
Evil Man, Dead Man (2006)
Fallacy (2008)
The Naturals (2008)

References

External links
Catherine at PureVolume

Metalcore musical groups from California
Heavy metal musical groups from California
Musical groups established in 2003
Musical groups disestablished in 2009
Rise Records artists